Renato Giovanelli (23 June 1923 – 30 October 1999) was an Italian architect. His work was part of the architecture event in the art competition at the 1948 Summer Olympics.

References

1923 births
1999 deaths
20th-century Italian architects
Olympic competitors in art competitions
Architects from Rome